The LG Incite is an Internet-enabled Windows Mobile Pocket PC smartphone designed and marketed by LG of Korea.

This phone has a reflective screen like the LG Shine but the difference is the chrome coated plastic

Product Details

Hardware
 Display : 3" Touch screen
 Resolution (pixels) : 240 x 400 wQVGA display
 Colors : 262K
 Keyboard : Touchscreen QWERTY On Screen, LG-Key On Screen
 Camera : 3.2MP Resolution, Live video capture and playback is also supported

Software
Operating System : Windows Mobile 6.1 Professional
 Windows Media Player Mobile 10 Installed
 Supported music formats : MP3 +AAC + eAAC+. EAAC+ WMA, WAV
Streaming Radio
 XM Satellite Radio, Pandora(for CT810, excluded in KU and SU series)
 Built-in FM Radio with RDS
 SMS and MMS Service : Available to send Pictures and Videos.
 Mobile Email
 Microsoft Direct Push
 Web browser
 Built-in Calendar, Alarm clock, Call Waiting, Caller ID, Personal Organizer(LG Today Application)
 Address book
 Call Forwarding
 Multitasking
 Use voice and data simultaneously

Carrier Supports

AT&T
 AT&T Mobile Music
 MusicID - Identify songs you're listening to
 Instant Messaging (IM) that supports AOL, Yahoo!, & Windows Live Messenger
 Xpress Mail - access work and personal email, including Microsoft Outlook, Lotus Notes, Yahoo! Mail, AOL, Windows Live and more
 MEdia(TM) Net for wireless internet access
 CV - news, sports, weather, entertainment and more
 MEdia(TM) Mall

SK Telecom
 SK Telecom Total Message Service Application(kr:통합메세지함)
 Nate(include mPlayOn) : WIPI - A Java-like VM for Most Korean Handheld Device
 MySmart : SK Telecom's Mobile AppStore
 Sync Mail : Push Mail Application

KT
 SHOW(include SHOW Download Pack) : Like Nate, This app is also WIPI VM.
 WebSurfing : Pull style Web Browser

Technical specifications

Battery
 Battery Type : 1300 mAh Lithium-ion polymer
 Talk time : Up to 8.7 hours
 Standby time : 21 days

Dimensions
 Weight : 4.23 ounces
 Size (inches) : 4.21 x 2.2 x 0.55 inches
 (millimeters) : 106.9 x 55.88 x 13.97mm

Memory
 Internal memory storage : 256 MB ROM, 128 MB RAM
 Expandable memory storage : 32 GB
 Memory format : microSD(TM)

Support Connection
 Wi-Fi IEEE 802.11 b/g
 3G UMTS/HSDPA Tri-Band(850/1900/2100Mhz)
 GSM Quad-band(850/900/1800/1900Mhz) with EDGE(High Speed Data Network)
 Bluetooth (Version 2.0 with EDR)
 Micro USB
 (for Only CT-810) Qualcomm A-GPS

See also
 List of LG mobile phones

References

External links
LG Incite Main Page
LG Incite Updates
LG Incite Blog(Korean)
AT&T's Incite Page
KT(SHOW)'s Incite Page

Incite
Windows Mobile Professional devices